This article refers to sports broadcasting contracts in Bosnia and Herzegovina. For a list of broadcasting rights in other countries, see Sports television broadcast contracts.

Football

 FIFA World Cup 2022: BHRT
 FIFA U-20 World Cup: Eurovision (until 2021)

 FIFA U-17 World Cup: Eurovision (until 2021)

FIFA Club World Cup: BHRT and Eurovision (2020)
 UEFA Youth Euros : Sport Klub, UEFA.tv
 UEFA U-19 Euro
 UEFA U-19 Women's Euro
 UEFA U-17 Euro
 UEFA U-17 Women's

Leagues:

UEFA Nations League: BHRT (only Bosnia and Herzegovina matches), Arena Sport (all matches exclude Bosnia and Herzegovina matches) (2022-2028) 

UEFA Champions League: Arena Sport (2021-2024)
UEFA Europa League: Arena Sport (2021-2024)
UEFA Europa Conference League: Arena Sport (2021-2024)
UEFA Youth League: Arena Sport
UEFA Women's Champions League: DAZN (2021-2025)
English Premier League: Nova Sport and Sport Klub (2012-2022), Arena Sport (2022-2028) 
English Championship: Sport Klub
English League One: Sport Klub
English League Two: Sport Klub
Spanish Primera League: Arena Sport
Spanish Segunda League: Arena Sport
German Bundesliga: Sport Klub, Nova Sport (2021-2025)
German 2. Bundesliga: Sport Klub (2021-2025)
German 3. Liga: Sport Klub (2020-)
Portuguese Primeira League: Arena Sport
Netherlands Eredivise: Sport Klub
Russian Premier League: Sport Klub
Scottish Premiership: Arena Sport
Scottish Championship: Arena Sport
Ukrainian Premier League: Sport Klub
Austrian Bundesliga: Sport Klub
Swiss Super League:Sport Klub
Danish Superliga: Sport Klub
Norwegian Eliteserien: Arena Sport
Italian Serie A: Arena Sport, RTRS (one match in Sunday)
France Ligue 1: Arena Sport,  ATV
Belgian League: Arena Sport
Czech League: Arena Sport
Serbian League: Arena Sport
Serbian First League: Arena Sport (sometimes)
Croatian League: Arena Sport
Bosnian League: Arena Sport
Chinese Super League: Arena Sport
Japanese League: Sport Klub (live coverage for J1 matches) and YouTube (live coverage for up to two J2 matches) (through 2022)
Australian Football League: Arena Sport
Korean League: Arena Sport
Brazilian Serie A: Arena Sport
Argentina Primera Division: Arena Sport
Copa Libertadores: Arena Sport
Copa Sudamericana: Arena Sport
Recopa Sudamericana: Arena Sport
CONCACAF Champions League: Sport Klub
Major League Soccer: Arena Sport
Women Bundesliga: Sport Klub (2020-)

Cups:

FA Cup: Sport Klub
Spanish Cup: Arena Sport
Italian Cup: Arena Sport
Netherlands Cup: Sport Klub
Russian Cup: Sport Klub
Scottish Cup: Sport Klub
Scottish Challenge Cup: Sport Klub
Ukrainian Cup: Sport Klub
Turkish Cup: Sport Klub
Danish Cup: Sport Klub
Slovenian Cup: Sport Klub
Community Shield: Sport Klub
Italian Super Cup: Arena Sport
Ukrainian Super Cup: Sport Klub
EFL Cup: Arena Sport
French Cup: Arena Sport
Portuguese Cup: Arena Sport
Greek Cup: Arena Sport
Polish Cup: Arena Sport
Romanian Cup: Arena Sport (final match) 
Bosnian Cup: Arena Sport
Brazilian Cup: Arena Sport
Serbian Cup: Arena Sport
UEFA Super Cup: Arena Sport
Belgian Super Cup: Arena Sport
French Super Cup: Arena Sport
International Champions Cup: Sport Klub
German Cup: Arena Sport
German Super Cup: Sport Klub

Futsal 
 FIFA Futsal World Cup: TBA (2020)
 UEFA Futsal Euro: TBA (2022)
 UEFA U-19 Futsal Euro: Sport Klub
UEFA Futsal Champions League: YouTube
 UEFA Women's Futsal Euro: Sport Klub

Fight Sports
Bushido MMA: DAZN: October 2022 to October 2025, all fights
Dream Boxing: DAZN: October 2022 to October 2025, all fights
Glory: Arena Sport
Golden Boy: DAZN
King of Kings: DAZN: October 2022 to October 2025, all fights
Matchroom: DAZN

Basketball

Leagues:
NBA: Arena Sport
Euroleague: Nova Sport and Sport Klub
Eurocup: Sport Klub
VTB United League: Sport Klub, RTRS
Turkish Basketball League: Sport Klub
Italian Basketball League: Sport Klub
German Basketball League: Sport Klub
FIBA Champions League: Arena Sport
ABA League: Arena Sport, ATV (only KK Igokea matches, and final matches)
NCAA: Arena Sport 
ACB League: Arena Sport
Greek League: Arena Sport
Serbian League: Arena Sport

Cups:
FIBA Intercontinental Cup: Arena Sport
Italian Basketball Cup: Sport Klub
Italian Basketball Super Cup: Sport Klub
Turkish Basketball Super Cup: Sport Klub
German Super Cup: Sport Klub
Serbian Cup: Arena Sport
Spain Cup: Arena Sport
Spain Super Cup: Arena Sport

Tennis

Australian Open: Eurosport
Roland Garros: Eurosport, RTRS
Wimbledon: Eurosport, Sport Klub, RTRS
US Open: Eurosport
ATP Masters 1000: Sport Klub
ATP 500: Sport Klub
ATP 250: Sport Klub (most tournaments), Arena Sport (some tournaments), Eurosport (some tournaments)
WTA tour: Sport Klub
Davis Cup: Sport Klub

Motosport

Formula 1: Sport Klub
Moto GP: Sport Klub
Moto 2: Sport Klub
Moto 3: Sport Klub
NASCAR: Sport Klub
Speedway World Championship: Sport Klub, Eurosport
WRC: Arena Sport
Formula E: Arena Sport
Porsche Supercup: Eurosport
WTCC: Eurosport

American Football

NFL: Nova Sport and Sport Klub
CEFL: Sport Klub
Serbian National League: Sport Klub

Handball

Spanish ASOBAL League: Sport Klub
Spanish Cup: Sport Klub
Spanish Super Cup: Sport Klub
Men's EHF Champions League: Arena Sport
Women's EHF Champions League: Arena Sport
German Bundesliga: Arena Sport
SEHA League: Arena Sport, BHT 1 (sometimes)
German Cup: Arena Sport
German Super Cup: Arena Sport
SRLS: RTS 2

Volleyball

Men's CEV Champions League: Sport Klub
Women's CEV Champions League: Sport Klub
Italian Volleyball League: Sport Klub
Italian Women's Volleyball League: Sport Klub
Volleyball World League: Arena Sport

Ice Hockey

KHL: Sport Klub
EBEL: Sport Klub
NHL: Arena Sport
CHL: Arena Sport

Athletics

Diamond League: Sport Klub

Water Polo
Adriatic League: Arena Sport

Cycling

Vuelta a España: Eurosport 
Tour de France: Eurosport 
Giro d'Italia: Eurosport
Tour de Suisse: Eurosport
UCI Road World Championships: Eurosport
UCI ProTour: Eurosport

Baseball 
 MLB: Arena Sport

Rugby 
European Rugby Champions Cup: Sport Klub
European Rugby Challenge Cup: Sport Klub
Aviva Premiership Rugby: Arena Sport
Six Nations Championship: Arena Sport
Pro14: Arena Sport
AFL:Eurosport

Winter Sports
Alpine Skiing World Cup:Eurosport
Biathlon World Cup: Eurosport
Ski jumping World Cup: Eurosport
FIS Nordic Combined World Cup: Eurosport
FIS Cross-Country World Cup: Eurosport
FIS Freestyle Skiing World Cup: Eurosport
FIS Snowboard World Cup: Eurosport

Beach Volleyball
European Beach Volleyball Championships: Arena Sport

References

Bosnia and Herzegovina
Television in Bosnia and Herzegovina
Sports television in Bosnia and Herzegovina